Shahidul Islam Biswas (1948-2006) is a Bangladesh Nationalist Party politician and the former Member of Parliament from Chuadanga-1.

Birth and family life 
Shahidul Islam Biswas was born on 1948.

Career
Biswas was a founding member of Bangladesh Jubo Dal. He was the General Secretary of Bangladesh Nationalist Party. He was elected to Parliament in 2001 from Chuadanga-1 as a candidate of Bangladesh Nationalist Party.

Death
Biswas died on 11 November 2006 in Ibn Sina Clinic, Dhaka, Bangladesh.

References

1948 births
2006 deaths
People from Chuadanga District
Bangladesh Nationalist Party politicians
8th Jatiya Sangsad members